Paul Harford (born 21 October 1974) is an English former footballer. His father was Ray Harford, who played for and managed numerous clubs.

Playing career
A former Arsenal trainee, he began his professional career at Blackburn Rovers, where his father, Ray Harford, was assistant manager to Kenny Dalglish. He was loaned out to Wigan Athletic at the start of the 1994–95 season, and made three Third Division appearances. He joined Fred Davies's Shrewsbury Town on loan in December, and played six Second Division games. He left Ewood Park at the end of 1995–96, despite his father having by then taking the management reins from Dalglish. He then spent 1996–97 and 1997–98 in the Football Conference with Farnborough Town. He then spent three seasons in the Isthmian League with Sutton United and one season with Aldershot Town.

References

External links

1974 births
Living people
Sportspeople from Chelmsford
English footballers
Arsenal F.C. players
Blackburn Rovers F.C. players
Wigan Athletic F.C. players
Shrewsbury Town F.C. players
Farnborough F.C. players
Sutton United F.C. players
Aldershot Town F.C. players
English Football League players
National League (English football) players
Isthmian League players
Association football midfielders